Backdoor is a 2000 Greek coming of age film

Plot
Dimitris is a 13-year-old boy, who just lost his father. While coping with the dead of this father, he also needs to cope with his mother having a new man. Besides all this he is trying to grow up and trying to be a normal teen.

Cast 
 Konstandinos Papadimitriou - Dimitris Kemeras
 Alexandriani Sikelianou - Foteini Kemera
 Haris Sozos - Apostolos Dedes
 Ieroklis Michaelidis - Uncle Ilias
 Antonis Kafetzopoulos - Giannis Kemeras

Directing 
The movie was directed by Yorgos Tsemperopoulos for whom this was the 4th movie he directed

Music

Merchandising

Criticism

References

External links 
 

2000 films